The 2010 IIHF Women's Challenge Cup of Asia was the inaugural tournament of the IIHF Women's Challenge Cup of Asia (CCoA). It was hosted in Shanghai during 10 April to 14 April and was organized and managed by the International Ice Hockey Federation (IIHF). Games were played at the Taipei Arena in Shanghai University City International Ice Hockey Arena. China 1 won the tournament, winning all of its five games and defeating Japan in the final 2–1.

Standings

Fixtures
All times local.

Bronze medal game

Gold medal game

References

External links
Internal Ice Hockey Federation

Iihf Women's Challenge Cup Of Asia, 2010
Asia
2010
2010
Women